Laurence Ryder (born 28 December 1966) also known as Loz Ryder is an Australian darts player who currently competes in the British Darts Organisation events.

Darts career
Ryder was born in Britain but in 2001 moved from Derby to Western Australia. In 2013 he won the Dosh Perth Open by beating Conan Ugle 6–3 in the final. Ryder played the full circuit of Australian Grand Prix events for the first time in 2014 and won five events as well as being the runner-up in five others to top the rankings. 
As a result, he qualified for the Perth Darts Masters and Sydney Darts Masters, losing in the opening rounds to Raymond van Barneveld and Peter Wright respectively.

His top ranking also ensured him a debut at the PDC World Darts Championship in 2015. He won six successive legs from 2–1 down in sets against world number 17 Justin Pipe to beat him 3–2. However, in the following round against Terry Jenkins he lost all 12 legs played in a  4–0 defeat. Two titles in the first half of the year saw him play in the Perth Darts Masters and Sydney Darts Masters as the number one player on the DPA Order of Merit. Defeats to Adrian Lewis and Peter Wright saw him knocked out in the first round of both events for the second year in a row. He also played in the Auckland Darts Masters, but was whitewashed 6–0 by Raymond van Barneveld in the opening round.

Ryder topped the Order of Merit for the second successive year to qualify for the 2016 World Championship, but he could only take two legs during his first round match with Vincent van der Voort in a 3–0 defeat. He lost 6–2 to Corey Cadby in the final of the Victoria Open.

Family
Ryder's grandfather Arthur Groves and uncle John Groves were both professional footballers.

World Championship results

PDC

 2015: Second round (lost to Terry Jenkins 0–4) (sets) 
 2016: First round (lost to Vincent van der Voort 0–3)

References

External links

Living people
Australian darts players
English emigrants to Australia
1966 births
Professional Darts Corporation associate players